Ľuboš Ilizi (born 13 October 1982) is a professional Slovak footballer.

External links
 HLSZ 

1982 births
Living people
Slovak footballers
Association football goalkeepers
MŠK Púchov players
Czech First League players
FC Viktoria Plzeň players
FK Baník Sokolov players
Vasas SC players
Slovak expatriate footballers
Expatriate footballers in the Czech Republic
Expatriate footballers in Hungary
Slovak expatriate sportspeople in the Czech Republic
Slovak expatriate sportspeople in Hungary